Priosphenodon is an extinct rhynchocephalian known from the early Late Cretaceous of Argentina. It is believed to have been a fairly large herbivore, having a longer snout than modern tuatara, with teeth specialised for shearing plant matter, like other members of Eilenodontinae. The teeth are densely packed with a cone-in-cone structure, and have prismatic enamel structure similar to those of mammals and the lizard Uromastyx, which was likely an adaptation to wear resistance in the absence of tooth replacement. Two species are known, P. avelesi and P. minimus. The latter has also been considered a part of the separate genus Kaikaifilusaurus.

Fossils of the genus have been found in the Candeleros and Cerro Barcino Formations in Argentina.

References

Prehistoric lepidosaurs
Prehistoric reptile genera
Cenomanian life
Turonian life
Late Cretaceous reptiles of South America
Cretaceous Argentina
Fossils of Argentina
Candeleros Formation
Cerro Barcino Formation
Fossil taxa described in 2003
Sphenodontia